This is a list of Belgian television related events from 1987.

Events
14 March - Liliane Saint-Pierre is selected to represent Belgium at the 1987 Eurovision Song Contest with her song "Soldiers of Love". She is selected to be the thirty-second Belgian Eurovision entry during Eurosong held at the Amerikaans Theater in Brussels.
9 May - The 32nd Eurovision Song Contest is held at the Palais du Contenaire in Brussels. Ireland wins the contest with the song "Hold Me Now", performed by Johnny Logan. That made Logan the first performer to win the contest twice, as he had won also in 1980.

Debuts

Television shows

1980s
Tik Tak (1981-1991)

Ending this year

Births
9 January - Rob Teuwen, actor
7 February - Stoffel Bollu, actor

Deaths